Billboard Hot R&B Hits: 1984 is a compilation album released by Rhino Records in 1995, featuring 10 hit rhythm and blues recordings from 1984.

All tracks on the album were hits on Billboard's Hot Black Singles chart. In addition, several of the songs were mainstream hits, charting on the Billboard Hot 100 during 1984 and early 1985.

Track listing

Track information and credits taken from the album's liner notes.

References

Billboard Hot R&B Hits albums
1996 compilation albums
Rhythm and blues compilation albums